The Rip-Off is a 1989 crime novel by Jim Thompson.

Plot
Britton Rainstar is deeply in love with a woman named Manuela Aloe and the longer he stays with her, the closer to death he comes.

References

1989 American novels
Novels by Jim Thompson
English-language books
American crime novels
Novels published posthumously